Syletor is a genus of ground beetles in the family Carabidae. This genus has a single species, Syletor imerinae. It is found on Reunion Island in the Indian Ocean.

References

Platyninae